Nicholas B. Moehlmann (born July 26, 1938) is a former Republican member of the Pennsylvania House of Representatives. He graduated from Yale University in 1960 with a bachelor's degree in Russian Studies. He is a veteran of the U.S. Army Intelligence Corps (1961-1964). A 1970 graduate of the Dickinson School of Law, he practiced law in Lebanon, Pennsylvania for five years before his election to the Pennsylvania House of Representatives in 1974, where he served eight terms. He was defeated for reelection for the 1990 term by Democrat Ed Arnold.

He was later appointed by Governor Tom Ridge to be Executive Director of the State Public School Building Authority and the state Higher Educational Facilities Authority, where he served for eight years. He is a former national director of the Balloon Federation of America safety seminars program, a commercial hot air balloon pilot and FAA licensed balloon repairman.

References

Republican Party members of the Pennsylvania House of Representatives
Living people
1938 births
20th-century American politicians
Politicians from Reading, Pennsylvania
Yale University alumni
Dickinson School of Law alumni